Bagra may refer to:

Places
Bagra, Kardzhali Province in Kardzhali Municipality, Bulgaria
Bagra, Marwar, in Jalore District of Rajasthan State (India)
Bagra, Barisal District, Bangladesh
Bagra, Chittagong, Bangladesh
Bagra, Dhaka, Bangladesh
Bagra, NWFP, Pakistan
Bagra Tawa a village in Madhya Pradesh, India (sometimes called only Bagra)

Other uses
The Bagra Army, an evil organization led by their Emperor Bagramon in Digimon Xros Wars
Tumke Bagra, Indian politician